The women's 'Individual Aero Kickboxing with Step' category involved seven women from five countries all based in Europe.  Each contestant went through five performances (1.5 to 2 minutes each) with the totals added up at the end of the event.  The joint gold medallists were Slovenia's Manja Simonic and Croatian Valerija Lukani who had equal scores at the end of the event.  Also with equal scores were Petra Kmetec from Slovenia and Hungary's Marianna Hegyi, both claiming silver.  Finally, the bronze medal went to Italian Laura Fiori, who would also claim a bronze in the other individual Aero Kickboxing category.

Results

See also
List of WAKO Amateur World Championships
List of WAKO Amateur European Championships
List of female kickboxers

References

External links
 WAKO World Association of Kickboxing Organizations Official Site

Kickboxing events at the WAKO World Championships 2007 Coimbra
2007 in kickboxing
Kickboxing in Portugal